Bismark Idan (born 10 August 1989) is a Ghanaian professional footballer who plays for Al Khartoum in the Sudan Premier League as a forward.

References

External links
ghanasoccernet.com
goal.com

1989 births
Living people
Ghanaian footballers
Al Khartoum SC players
Association football forwards
Ghanaian expatriate sportspeople in Sudan
Ghanaian expatriate footballers
Berekum Chelsea F.C. players
New Edubiase United F.C. players
Medeama SC players
Göztepe S.K. footballers
Ghanaian expatriate sportspeople in Turkey
Expatriate footballers in Turkey
Expatriate footballers in Sudan
2011 African Nations Championship players
Ghana A' international footballers